Peter Vonhof  (born 15 January 1949) is a retired track cyclist and road bicycle racer from Germany, who represented West Germany at the 1976 Summer Olympics in Montreal, Quebec, Canada. There he won the gold medal in the Men's Team Pursuit, alongside Gregor Braun, Hans Lutz and Günther Schumacher.

References

External links
 databaseOlympics

1949 births
Living people
German male cyclists
Cyclists at the 1972 Summer Olympics
Cyclists at the 1976 Summer Olympics
Olympic cyclists of West Germany
Olympic gold medalists for West Germany
Cyclists from Berlin
Olympic medalists in cycling
Medalists at the 1972 Summer Olympics
Medalists at the 1976 Summer Olympics
German track cyclists
West German male cyclists